List of members of the 3rd Jatiya Sangsad This is a list of Members of Parliament (MPs) elected to the 3rd Parliament of the Jatiya Sangsad, the National Parliament of Bangladesh, by Bangladeshi constituencies. The list includes both MPs elected at the 1986 general election, held in 7 May 1986, and nominated women's members for reserved seats and those subsequently elected in by-elections.

Members

Elected members of parliament

Members of the Reserved Women's Seat

References 

Members of the Jatiya Sangsad by term
3rd Jatiya Sangsad members
Jatiya Sangsad